Aquamicrobium ahrensii is a gram-negative, aerobic, bacteria from the genus of Aquamicrobium which was isolated from biofilter from an animal rendering plant in Germany.

References

External links
Type strain of Aquamicrobium ahrensii at BacDive -  the Bacterial Diversity Metadatabase

Phyllobacteriaceae
Bacteria described in 2012